Leifur Sigfinnur Garðarsson (born 23 February 1968) is an Icelandic former basketball referee, multi-sport athlete and football manager.

Basketball

Referee career
Leifur started refereeing in 1987. During the 1991 Úrvalsdeild karla playoffs, Leifur was hit by a fan and threatened violence following a match between bitter rivals Njarðvík and Keflavík. He retired from refereeing in 2004 to focus on furthering his football managing career but returned in 2013.

He was a FIBA referee from 1993 to 2004 and again from 2014 to 2018 when he retired due to age restrictions for international referees.

Titles and awards

Titles
Icelandic Basketball Cup (2)
1985, 1986

Awards
Icelandic Basketball Referee of the Year (8)
1992, 1997, 1999, 2000, 2001, 2002, 2003, 2004
Source

Football
Leifur played several seasons in the Icelandic top-tier Úrvalsdeild karla with Fimleikafélag Hafnarfjarðar and Þór Akureyri. He was an assistant manager to FH from 2003 to 2005. He was the manager of Fylkir from 2006 to 2008 and Knattspyrnufélagið Víkingur from 2008 to 2011.

Titles
1. deild karla
2010

References

External links
Úrvalsdeild statistics at kki.is

1968 births
Living people
FIBA referees
Leifur Gardarsson
Leifur Gardarsson
Leifur Gardarsson
Leifur Gardarsson
Leifur Gardarsson
Leifur Gardarsson
Leifur Gardarsson
Leifur Gardarsson
Association footballers not categorized by position